Emma Boorman was a nineteenth-century artist who specialised in woodcuts. She trained in Vienna.

References 

19th-century British artists
British women artists
Year of birth missing
Year of death missing